Satere Tarf Natu is a small village in Ratnagiri district, Maharashtra state in Western India. The 2011 Census of India recorded a total of 543 residents in the village. Satere Tarf Natu is 337.56 hectares in size.

References

Villages in Ratnagiri district